Sayyed Bozorg "Moody" Mahmoody (Persian: دكتر سيد بزرگ محمودى c. 1939 – August 23, 2009) was an Iranian professor, engineer, and anesthesiologist, best-known for being accused of taking his American wife Betty and their daughter Mahtob to his native country and allegedly keeping them hostage there for a period of eighteen months during the mid-1980s.

Without My Daughter (2002, Finland) is a 90-minute documentary directed by Kari Tervo and Alexis Kouros

Early life
Mahmoody was born to a prominent family in Shustar. Mahmoody's father, a doctor, died when Mahmoody was a toddler, and he had little to no memories of him. His mother, also a doctor, died when he was eight years old, and he was raised by his older sister.

Mahmoody left Iran at the age of 18 to study English in London. He moved to the United States in 1961, where he became a university mathematics professor and an engineer. He worked for NASA during the 1960s, then went to medical school and became an anesthesiologist.

Marriage and fatherhood
Mahmoody met Betty Lover in 1974. They dated for three years and Betty referred to him by the nickname, "Moody". After officially becoming a licensed anesthesiologist based in the U.S., Moody married Betty in Houston in 1977.  Moody claimed Betty proposed to him, converted to Islam and took a lively interest in Persian culture.  They resided in Texas.  "He was so affectionate and considerate. He would send me flowers, books, music boxes, with beautiful inscriptions." 

Their daughter, Mahtob, which means "moonlight" in Persian, was born in 1979.  It was Moody who named her that, after he looked at a full moon.  The Mahmoodys later moved to Michigan.

Life since estrangement
After returning home, Betty filed for divorce. According to Betty Moody, "The night before September 11, 2001, I was informed that (Moody) had a green card and was not only back in the U.S., but he was just a few blocks away from my house in Michigan.  After he was eventually placed on a terrorist list, he was never allowed back to the U.S."

A 2002 documentary was made by Alexis Kouros and Kari Tervo titled Without My Daughter.  The documentary depicted Moody defending his actions and telling the story through his perspective. It also depicted his attempts to contact Mahtob. Mahmoody also authored a book called Lost Without My Daughter in which he counterattacks Betty's claims against him.

Media portrayal
Moody was portrayed by English-American actor Alfred Molina in the 1991 film, Not Without My Daughter, adapted from  Betty's book of the same name.  Reacting to the film and Molina's portrayal of him, Moody said, "I asked, is this supposed to be me? As you can see, I am short, bald on top, and I wear glasses: no resemblance at all, which tells a great deal about how realistic the whole movie is."  Molina was once assaulted by a man who apparently hated his brutal portrayal of Moody in the film.

Death
Mahmoody died in Tehran on August 23, 2009. The cause of death was given as renal disease.

References

1930s births
2009 deaths
People from Shushtar
Iranian anesthesiologists
Iranian emigrants to the United Kingdom
Iranian emigrants to the United States
Deaths from kidney disease
Date of birth unknown